The 1960 Kansas State Wildcats football team represented Kansas State University in the 1960 NCAA University Division football season.  The team's head football coach was Doug Weaver.  It was Weaver's first season at the helm of the Wildcats.  The Wildcats played their home games in Memorial Stadium.  The Wildcats finished the season with a 1–9 record with a 0–7 record in conference play.  They finished in eighth place.  The Wildcats scored just 78 points and gave up 316 points.

Schedule

References

Kansas State
Kansas State Wildcats football seasons
Kansas State Wildcats football